was a Japanese economist and is considered one of the most important theorists on the field of Marx's theory of value. His main work Principles of Economics [経済原論] was published in 1950-52. Among his scholars are Thomas T. Sekine and Makoto Itoh.

Thought
Uno based his work on a rigorously Hegelian reading of Marx's Capital.  This led him to his well-known conclusion that Marxian analysis had to be conducted at three separate levels:
 Theory of Principles [原理論]: The "pure" theory of Capital, freed from the complications of history – highly abstract exercises in dialectical logic on the basic, core dynamics of capitalist economy.
 Theory of Stages [段階論]: A "middle" level, which traces the general development of capitalism through distinct historical stages – mercantilism, classical liberalism and so on.
 Analysis of the Present [現状分析]: The analysis of the 'messy' details of capitalist economy in the real world, concentrating on particular narratives rather than an overall picture.

Uno and his followers have come in for criticism from the wider Marxist tradition for insisting on this separation.  Simon Clarke sees this schema as "scholastic formalism", and the second level as an arbitrary addition to provide a link between the other two, rather than an analytically necessary one.  As Kincaid points out, though, Capital is primarily a logically rather than chronologically argued work, which looks at the laws of capitalist development and draws mainly supporting evidence from historical data.  Thus, the separation of the Uno school represents an acknowledgement of this logical nature, and registers the  key problem of how the critique can be linked to actual economic development in a way that competing schools often cannot.

Chronology
1897
 November 12th — Born in Kurashiki Town, Okayama Prefecture [岡山県倉敷町]
1915
 March — Graduates from Okayama Prefectural Takahashi Middle School [岡山県立高梁中学校]
 July — Enrolls at the Sixth Higher School [第六高等学校]
1918
 June — Graduates from the Sixth Higher School
 July — Enrolls in the German Law section at the Faculty of Law, Tokyo Imperial University [東京帝国大学法科大学独法科] but soon transfers to the Economics section
1921
 April — Graduates from Economics section at the Faculty of Economics, Tokyo Imperial University [東京帝国大学経済学部経済学科]
 May — Becomes a non-regular employee [嘱託] at the Ōhara Institute for Social Research [大原社会問題研究所]
1922
 July 2nd — Marries Takano Maria [高野マリア]
 September — Leaves for Europe to research economics, residing mainly in Berlin
1922-24
 Resigns from the Ōhara Institute for Social Research
 Enrolls at the University of Berlin and attends a few lectures by Werner Sombart, Hermann Schumacher, Ernst Wagemann, Heinrich Cunow and Gustav Mayer, but does not study under anyone and mainly studies by himself
 Attends a SPD conference (where Hilferding was present) with Sakisaka Itsurō, goes to socialist and communist meetings, reads Vorwärts and Die Rote Fahne
 Focusses on studying Marx’s Capital along with the recently published German edition of Lenin’s Imperialism, but finds Lukács’s History and Class Consciousness and Korsch’s Marxism and Philosophy “too ideological”
1924
 September — Returns to Japan; brings back Hilferding’s Finance Capital and studies it
 October — Appointed as an Associate Professor at the Faculty of Law and Literature, Tohoku Imperial University [東北帝国大学法文学部]
1925
 September — Becomes responsible for the Economics III module (Theory of Economy Policy) [経済学第三講座 (経済政策論)] at Tohoku Imperial University
1930
 June — Debut article ‘The Necessity of Money: Hilferding’s Monetary Theory Reconsidered’ [貨幣の必然性——ヒルファディングの貨幣理論再考察] published in the journal Shakai Kagaku [社会科学]
1938
 February — Arrested in Sendai in connection with the so-called Rōnōha Professors Incident [労農派教授グループ事件] and remains in custody until May
 December — Indicted under the National Security Law [治安維持法] and ordered to take a leave of absence
1939
 October — Ruled not guilty in the first hearing at the Sendai District Court
1940
 December — Ruled not guilty in the second hearing at the Miyagi Court of Appeal
1941
 January — Reinstatement is approved by the Committee of Professors [教授会] of the Faculty of Law and Literature, Tohoku Imperial University, but declines and resigns
 March — Employed at the Institute for Japanese Trade at the Japan Trade Promotion Association [財団法人日本貿易振興協会日本貿易研究所]
1944
 June — Resigns from the Institute for Japanese Trade at the Japan Trade Promotion Association
 July — Employed at the Mitsubishi Economic Research Institute [財団法人三菱経済研究所]
1946
 March — Becomes a lecturer at Tohoku Imperial University
1947
 January — Resigns from the Mitsubishi Economic Research Institute and becomes a non-regular employee [嘱託] at the Institute of Social Science, Tokyo Imperial University [東京帝国大学社会科学研究所]
 June — Appointed as a Professor at Tokyo Imperial University and employed at their Institute of Social Science
1949
 June — Appointed as the Director [所長] of the Institute of Social Science, University of Tokyo 
1952
 February — Resigns as Director from the Institute of Social Science, University of Tokyo 
1953
 January — Becomes a Secretary [理事] of the Institute of Statistical Research [財団法人統計研究会]
 May — Given a role at the Social Science section at the Graduate School of the University of Tokyo [東京大学大学院社会科学研究科] and becomes responsible for their theoretical economics and history of economics courses [理論経済学・経済史学専門課程]
1954
 December — Receives a doctorate in economics
1958
 March — Resigns from the University of Tokyo after reaching their mandatory retirement age
 April — Appointed as a Professor at the Department of Sociology, Hosei University
1968
 March — Resigns as Professor from Hosei University
 April — Becomes a lecturer for the Social Science section of the Graduate School of Hosei University [法政大学大学院社会科学研究科]
 Junes — Becomes a non-regular employee [嘱託] at the Institute for Economic Research, Rissho University [立正大学経済研究所]
1969
 March — Resigns as lecturer from the Graduate School of Hosei University
1972
 March — Resigns as non-regular employee from the Institute for Economic Research, Rissho University
 May 21st — Suffers a stroke and is bedridden thereafter
1977
 February 22nd — Dies at home in Kugenuma, Fujisawa City [藤沢市鵠沼]

Publications

As author
 Theory of Economic Policy, Vol. 1 [経済政策論 上巻] (Kōbundō [弘文堂], 1936; reprinted 1948; 2nd ed. 1954; reprinted in SW7).
 In the 1954 edition, “Vol. 1” was dropped from the title.
 Prolegomena to the Agrarian Question [農業問題序論] (Kaizōsha [改造社], 1947; 2nd ed. Aoki Shoten [青木書店], 1965; reprinted in SW8; reprinted Kobushi Bunko [こぶし文庫], 2014).
 Theory of Value [価値論] (Kawade Shobō [河出書房], 1947; reprinted Aoki Shoten [青木書店], 1965; reprinted in SW3; reprinted Kobushi Bunko [こぶし文庫], 1996).
 Introduction to Capital [資本論入門] (Hakujitsu Shoin [白日書院], 1948; 2nd. ed. Sōgen Bunko [創元文庫], 1952; reprinted Aoki Shoten [青木書店], 1968; reprinted in SW6; reprinted Kōdansha Gakujutsu Bunko [講談社学術文庫], 1977).
 A reader’s guide to Capital, Vol. 1.
 Studies on Capital [資本論の研究] (Iwanami Shoten [岩波書店], 1949; reprinted in SW3).
 Introduction to Capital, Vol. 2 [資本論入門 第二巻解説] (Hakujitsu Sho'in [白日書院], 1949; reprinted in SW6; reprinted Iwanami Shoten [岩波書店], 1977).
 Principles of Economics [経済原論] (Iwanami Shoten [岩波書店], 1950-52; reprinted in SW1).
 Published in 2 volumes. “経済原論” is the same title as Marshall’s Principles of Economics in Japanese.
 For Social Science [社会科学のために] (Kōbundō [弘文堂], 1952; most of it reprinted in SW9-10).
 Studies on the Theory of Value [価値論の研究] (Tokyo Daigaku Shuppankai [東京大学出版会], 1952; reprinted in SW3).
 Theory of Crisis [恐慌論] (Iwanami Shoten [岩波書店], 1953; reprinted in SW5; reprinted Iwanami Bunko [岩波文庫], 2010).
 Capital and Socialism [『資本論』と社会主義] (Iwanami Shoten [岩波書店], 1954; reprinted in SW10; reprinted Kobushi Bunko [こぶし文庫], 1995).
 Studies on the Principles of Marxist Economics [マルクス経済学原理論の研究] (Iwanami Shoten [岩波書店], 1959; reprinted in SW4).
 Methodology of Economics [経済学方法論] (Tokyo Daigaku Shuppankai [東京大学出版会], 1962; reprinted in SW9).
 Economics Seminar, Vol. 1: Method of Economics [経済学ゼミナール1 経済学の方法] (Hōsei Daigaku Shuppankai [法政大学出版会], 1963).
 Economics Seminar, Vol. 2: Issues in the Theory of Value [経済学ゼミナール2 価値論の問題点] (Hōsei Daigaku Shuppankai [法政大学出版会], 1963).
 Economics Seminar, Vol. 3: Problems of the Theory of Crisis and the Theory of Commercial Profit [経済学ゼミナール3 恐慌論・商業利潤論の諸問題] (Hōsei Daigaku Shuppankai [法政大学出版会], 1963).
 Principles of Economics [経済原論] (Iwanami Zensho [岩波全書], 1964; reprinted in SW2; reprinted Iwanami Bunko [岩波文庫], 2016).
 The abridged but revised edition of the 1950-52 Principles of Economics.
 Fundamental Problems of Social Science [社会科学の根本問題] (Aoki Shoten [青木書店], 1966; reprinted in SW9-10).
 Discussion on Economics [経済学を語る] (Tokyo Daigaku Shuppankai [東京大学出版会], 1967).
 Economics as Social Science [社会科学としての経済学] (Chikuma Shobō [筑摩書房], 1969; most of it reprinted in SW9-10; reprinted Chikuma Gakugei Bunko [ちくま学芸文庫], 2016).
 Problems of Marxist Economics [マルクス経済学の諸問題] (Iwanami Shoten [岩波書店], 1969; Part 1 reprinted in SW4, Part 2 in SW10).
 Economic Theory of Capital [資本論の経済学] (Iwanami Shinsho [岩波新書], 1969; reprinted in SW6).
 Fifty Years with Capital [資本論五十年] (Hōsei Daigaku Shuppankai [法政大学出版会], 1970-73).
 Published in 2 volumes. In interviews, Uno details his intellectual biography.
 Theory of Economic Policy [経済政策論] (Kōbundō [弘文堂], 1971; reprinted in SW7).
 The revised edition of the 1936 Theory of Economic Policy.
 Utility of Economics [経済学の効用] (Tokyo Daigaku Shuppankai [東京大学出版会], 1972).
 Selected Works of Uno Kōzō [宇野弘蔵著作集] (Iwanami Shoten [岩波書店], 1973-74).
 Published in 11 volumes [SW].
 Learning from Capital [資本論に学ぶ] (Tokyo Daigaku Shuppankai [東京大学出版会], 1975; reprinted Chikuma Gakugei Bunko [ちくま学芸文庫], 2015).
 Capital and Me [『資本論』と私] (Ochanomizu Shobō [御茶の水書房], 2008).

As co-author
 Uno Kōzō and Umemoto Katsumi [梅本克己], Social Science and the Dialectic [社会科学と弁証法] (Iwanami Shoten [岩波書店], 1976; reprinted Kobushi Bunko [こぶし文庫], 2006).
 Uno Kōzō, Ōuchi Tsutomu [大内力] and Ōshima Kiyoshi [大島清], Capitalism: Its Development and Structure [資本主義——その発達と構造] (Kadokawa Sensho [角川選書], 1978).
 Uno Kōzō and Fuji’i Hiroshi [藤井洋], The Archetype of Modern Capitalism [現代資本主義の原型] (Kobushi Bunko [こぶし文庫], 1997).

As editor
 Studies on the Bloc Economy as Seen through the Sugar Industry [糖業より見たる広域経済の研究] (Kurita Shoten [栗田書店], 1944).
 “広域経済” is the Japanese translation of ‘Großraumwirtschaft’.
 Lectures on the Principles of Economics [経済原論 経済学演習講座] (Seirin Shoin [青林書院], 1955; 2nd ed. Seirin Shoin Shinsha [青林書院新社], 1969; Q&A section reprinted in SW2).
 Economics [経済学] (Kadokawa Zensho [角川全書], 1956; reprinted Kadokawa Sophia Bunko [角川ソフィア文庫], 2019).
 Published in 2 volumes.
 Studies on Land Tax Reform [地租改正の研究] (Tokyo Daigaku Shuppankai [東京大学出版会], 1957-58).
 Published in 2 volumes.
 The Present State of the Rural Economy in Japan under Economic Stability [日本農村経済の実態——経済安定下における] (Tokyo Daigaku Shuppankai [東京大学出版会], 1961).
 Capital Studies, Vol. 1: Commodity, Money and Capital [資本論研究1 商品・貨幣・資本] (Chikuma Shobō [筑摩書房], 1967).
 Capital Studies, Vol. 2: Surplus Value and Accumulation [資本論研究2 剰余価値・蓄積] (Chikuma Shobō [筑摩書房], 1967).
 Capital Studies, Vol. 3: Distribution Process of Capital [資本論研究3 資本の流通過程] (Chikuma Shobō [筑摩書房], 1967).
 Capital Studies, Vol. 4: Production Price and Profit [資本論研究4 生産価格・利潤] (Chikuma Shobō [筑摩書房], 1968).
 Capital Studies, Vol. 5: Interest and Rent [資本論研究5 利子・地代] (Chikuma Shobō [筑摩書房], 1968).

As co-editor
 Capital Studies: Commodity and Process of Exchange [資本論研究——商品及交換過程] (Kawade Shobō [河出書房], 1948).
 Capital Studies: Process of Distribution [資本論研究——流通過程] (Kawade Shobō [河出書房], 1949).
 Studies on Marxist Economics: Festschrift for Prof. Ōuchi Hyōe on the Occasion of His Sixtieth Birthday, Vol. 1 [マルクス経済学の研究——大内兵衛先生還暦記念論文集（上）] (Iwanami Shoten [岩波書店], 1953).
 The World Economy and the Japanese Economy: Festschrift for Prof. Ōuchi Hyōe on the Occasion of His Sixtieth Birthday, Vol. 2 [世界経済と日本経済——大内兵衛先生還暦記念論文集（下）] (Iwanami Shoten [岩波書店], 1956).
 Japanese Capitalism and Agriculture [日本資本主義と農業] (Iwanami Shoten [岩波書店], 1959).
 Dictionary of Capital [資本論辞典] (Aoki Shoten [青木書店], 1961).

As translator
 Friedrich Engels, ‘Über historischen Materialismus’ [史的唯物論について], Marx-Engels Complete Works, Vol. 12 [マルクス＝エンゲルス全集 第十二巻] (Kaizōsha [改造社], 1928).
 Karl Marx, ‘Die moralisierende Kritik und die kritisierende Moral’ [道学的批判と批判学的道徳], Marx-Engels Complete Works, Vol. 3 [マルクス＝エンゲルス全集 第三巻] (Kaizōsha [改造社], 1929).
 Walter Bagehot, Lombard Street [ロンバード街——ロンドンの金融市場] (Iwanami Bunko [岩波文庫], 1941).

Uno’s works in English translation
 Principles of Political Economy: Theory of a Purely Capitalist Society, trans. Thomas T. Sekine (Brighton: The Harvester Press, 1980).
 Translation of the abridged 1964 Iwanami Zensho edition of Principles of Economics.
 The Types of Economic Policies under Capitalism, trans. Thomas T. Sekine, ed. John R. Bell (Leiden: Brill, 2016).
 Translation of the 1971 edition of Theory of Economic Policy.
 Theory of Crisis, trans. Ken C. Kawashima (Leiden: Brill, 2020).

Bibliography

Books

Essays

References

External links
 Verified, continuously updated selected bibliography with links and materials. (Broken link. See partial fix for same link at  end of page for Isaak Rubin. Also check for other pages re value form school likely to need same fix)

Marxian economists
Marxist theorists
Japanese Marxists
Japanese economists
1897 births
1977 deaths